The 1926–27 SK Rapid Wien season was the 29th season in club history.

Squad

Squad and statistics

Squad statistics

Fixtures and results

League

Cup

References

1926-27 Rapid Wien Season
Rapid